Lamet is a Mon–Khmer language of Laos. There are also one hundred speakers in Lampang Province, Thailand, where it is known as Khamet. Lamet speakers call their language [χəmɛːt], or less commonly [kʰəmɛːt].

Locations
Lamet of Lampang was originally spoken in Takluh village north of Namtha in Laos.

A closely related variety called Lua' is spoken in Ban Pang Chok (Ban Lua), Wiang Pa Pao District, southern Chiang Rai Province, Thailand.

References

Narumol, Charoenma. 1980. The sound systems of Lampang Lamet and Wiang Papao Lua. MA thesis, Mahidol University.
Narumol, Charoenma. 1982. The phonologies of a Lampang Lamet and Wiang Papao Lua. The Mon-Khmer Studies Journal 11. 35-45.

External links 
 http://projekt.ht.lu.se/rwaai RWAAI (Repository and Workspace for Austroasiatic Intangible Heritage)
 http://hdl.handle.net/10050/00-0000-0000-0003-66ED-E@view Lamet in RWAAI Digital Archive

Palaungic languages
Languages of Laos